Blackshear may refer to:

Blackshear (surname)
Blackshear, Georgia, city in Georgia, USA
Lake Blackshear, lake in Georgia, USA